This is a list of international airports in Canada.

As defined by Transport Canada, an international airport:

There are currently 13 airports designated as international by Transport Canada:

Airports of entry

The following airports are listed in the Canada Flight Supplement, or Water Aerodrome Supplement, published by Nav Canada as an airport of entry—but are not classified as international airports. All these airports, with the exception of military airports, have a Canada Border Services Agency person available but they may not be available 24 hours a day and may only be open part of the week.

See also
 National Airports System
 List of the busiest airports in Canada

Notes

References
 
 

International